The following is a timeline of the history of Nantucket, Massachusetts, USA.

17th century
 1621 – Island granted to Plymouth Company of London.
 1641 – Island bought by Thomas Mayhew.
 1659
 Island sold to Thomas Barnard, Peter Coffin, Tristram Coffin, Christopher Hussey, Thomas Macy, William Pike, John Swayne, and Richard Swayne.
 Proprietors of the Common and Undivided Land established.
 1660 – Island becomes part of the Province of New York.
 1661 – Settlers arrive from Amesbury and Salisbury, Massachusetts.
 1665 – Maddequet Ditch (canal) dug.
 1671 – Town incorporated.
 1672 – Town relocated to Wescoe from Madaket.
 1673 – Town named "Sherburne."
 1683 – Island becomes part of Dukes County, Province of New York.
 1686 – Jethro Coffin house built.
 1692 – Island becomes part of the Province of Massachusetts Bay.
 1695 – Nantucket County established.

18th century

 1712 – Sperm whaling begins.
 1713 – Tuckernuck Island becomes part of Nantucket County.
 1732 – Quaker meeting house built.
 1746
 Lighthouse and East Mill constructed.
 The Old Mill an historic windmill.
 1774 – Population: 4,545.
 1775 – Nantucket tentatively states their neutrality during the American Revolutionary War.
 1779 – April: British loyalists raid island.
 1784 - Great Point Light established.
 1795 – Town of Sherburne renamed "Nantucket."

19th century
 1810
 Second Congregational Meeting House incorporated.
 Population: 6,807.
 1814 – Nantucket declares neutrality in the US-British War of 1812.
 1816 – May: Nantucket Gazette newspaper begins publication.
 1817 – Fragment Society formed.
 1820
 Nantucket Mechanics' Social Library Society founded.
 Population: 7,266.
 1821 – The Inquirer newspaper begins publication.
 1823
 Columbian Library Society founded.
 United Methodist Church built.
 1827 – United Library Association and Lancasterian school founded.
 1834 – Nantucket Athenaeum incorporated.
 1835
 African Methodist Episcopal Church incorporated.
 Silk Factory in business.
 1836 – Ladies' Howard Society formed.
 1838 - Nantucket High School established.
 1839 – Trinity Church built.
 1840 – First Baptist Church built.
 1846 – Fire.
 1848 – Atlantic House hotel in business in Siasconset.
 1850 - Sankaty Head Light built.
 1854 – Lightship Nantucket and Town Library established.
 1855 - Death of Dorcas Honorable, Nantucket's last Native American Wampanoag Indian.
 1856
 Nantucket Agricultural Society founded.
 Lighthouse rebuilt.
 1864 – Josiah Freeman photography studio in business.
 1866 – Union Benevolent Society founded.
 1869 - Nantucket's last whaler sailed.
 1873 – Nantucket Relief Association founded.
 1875 – Civil War monument erected.
 1877 – Sherburne Lyceum organized.
 1881 – Nantucket Railroad built.
 1883 – Siasconset Union Chapel, Nantucket Hotel, Surf-Side Hotel and Springfield Hotel built.
 1886
 Electric telegraph installed.
 New Bedford, Martha's Vineyard, and Nantucket Steamboat Company formed.
 Wyer's Art Store in business (approximate date).
 1892 – Point Breeze Hotel in business.
 1894 – Nantucket Historical Association founded.
 1895 – Goldenrod Literary and Debating Society founded.
Original Nantucket Railroad reaches bankruptcy, Nantucket Central Railroad Company established
 1897 – Church of St. Mary-Our Lady of the Isle built.

20th century

 1901 – Brant Point Light rebuilt.
 1902 – Maria Mitchell Association founded.
 1908 – Maria Mitchell Observatory built.
 1910 – Population: 2,962 (county).
 1917 - Nantucket Central Railroad Company closes after all available trains were commandeered by the United States Army to serve in the Western Front of World War One
 1923 – Sankaty Head Golf Club opens.
 1925 – Nobska (steamship) begins operating in region.
 1930 – Whaling Museum opens.
 1940 – Straight Wharf Theatre established.
 1945 – Murray's Toggery Shop in business.
 1956 – July 25:  wrecked offshore.
 1966 – Nantucket Historic District established.
 1970 – Population: 3,774.
 1972 – Hy-Line ferry begins operating.
 1974 – Coskata-Coatue Wildlife Refuge established (approximate date).
 1975 – Nantucket National Wildlife Refuge established.
 1976 – December 15: MV Argo Merchant wrecked offshore.
 1990 – Population: 6,012.
 1995 – Nantucket Regional Transit Authority begins operating.
 1997 – Bill Delahunt becomes U.S. representative for Massachusetts's 10th congressional district.
 1999
 October 31: EgyptAir Flight 990 crashes south of island, 217 dead.
 African Meeting House restored.

21st century

 2001 – Alliance to Protect Nantucket Sound organized.
 2010
 Cape Wind (wind farm) development approved.
 Population: 10,172.
 2011 – William R. Keating becomes U.S. representative for Massachusetts's 10th congressional district.

See also
 History of Nantucket
 National Register of Historic Places listings in Nantucket County, Massachusetts

References

Further reading
Published in the 19th century
 
 
 
  2nd ed., 1880
 
 
 
 
 
 
 
 
 

Published in the 20th century
 
  Reprint of 1782 London ed.
 Letters 4-5,  7-8: Description of Nantucket, etc.

External links

 Library of Congress, Prints & Photos division. Items related to Nantucket, various dates.
 Europeana. Items related to Nantucket
 Digital Public Library of America. Works related to Nantucket, various dates

Years in Massachusetts
History of Nantucket, Massachusetts
Nantucket
Nantucket